Halloween with the New Addams Family is a 1977 American made-for-television comedy horror film based on the 1964–1966 sitcom The Addams Family. In contrast to the "new" in the title, most of the original series regulars reprised their roles, including John Astin, Carolyn Jones (billed as a "special guest star"), Jackie Coogan, Ted Cassidy, Lisa Loring, Ken Weatherwax and Felix Silla. Eleven years after the cancellation of the 1960s TV series, it was the only presentation that brought together most of the original cast in a color production, shot on videotape.

Plot
Gomez's brother Pancho is staying with the Family while Gomez goes to a lodge convention in Tombstone, Arizona. Gomez is jealous of his brother, who once courted Morticia. Halloween is nigh and Pancho tells the legend of Cousin Shy, who distributes gifts and carves pumpkins. Actually, Gomez has been lured off by crooks who have bugged the house in order to steal the Family fortune.

The lead crook "Bones" Lafferty sends Mikey to investigate. Wednesday (Senior) is home from music academy, where she studied the piccolo (she breaks glass with it). Pugsley (Senior) is home from Nairobi medical school, where he's training to be a witch doctor. Mikey panics and flees after treading on Kitty Kat's tail. The crooks have a fake Gomez and Morticia to help in their plans, along with two strong-arm goons, Hercules and Atlas. Gomez returns home for the Halloween party and trimming of the scarecrow.

Lafferty poses as Quincy Addams (from Boston) to get in. He has his men tie up Gomez and Morticia and his doubles take their places, confusing Pancho, who's still infatuated with Morticia. Lurch scares off the thugs and terrifies the assistant crook Louie the Lard (who was dressed as Little Bo Peep). Fester, trying to be nice, puts Lafferty on the rack. Lafferty tries to escape through the secret passage and steps on Kitty Kat's tail. When the police arrive upon responding to a noise complaint, Lafferty and his gang surrender.

The Addams Family are then free to celebrate Halloween happily, ending the night by singing together in welcome for Cousin Shy.

Cast

Production
Blossom Rock, who had originally portrayed Grandmama, was ill at the time of the production (she died in January 1978, nearly three months after this special aired), causing her role to be given to Jane Rose. Margaret Hamilton, who had portrayed Mother Frump, declined to appear in the film; her role was played by Elvia Allman. Character actors Parley Baer and Vito Scotti, who both had recurring roles in the original series, also appeared in the movie, but as different characters than they had portrayed originally.

Home media
In 1989, GoodTimes Home Video released Halloween with the New Addams Family on VHS.

References

External links

1977 horror films
1977 television films
1977 films
1970s comedy horror films
American comedy horror films
NBC network original films
Television films as pilots
Television series reunion films
Films based on television series
Television films based on television series
Halloween television specials
The Addams Family films
American films about Halloween
Films scored by Vic Mizzy
Films with screenplays by George Tibbles
American drama television films
1970s American films